Hringbraut is a privately held Icelandic media company that operates a television station free to air, non-subscription, reaching 98% of all households in Iceland. Its programming is all in Icelandic, broadcasting 24/7 and in HD.

About the media 
The Icelandic television station Hringbraut (and the station's web) first aired in February 2015. Mr. Sigmundur Ernir Rúnarsson, Editor-in-chief of Hringbraut said that there was a space available on the Icelandic television market, since the station would be being different from what was before in the market. "We believe there is room for a broad and informative talk show Channel, backed up by a diverse website, open to all Iceland's potential, for the benefit of homes and businesses, with experienced staff at the helm."

When Hringbraut started, it sent out a press release explaining its policy and purpose:"Hringbraut is a new, diverse and free television and web site that focuses on dynamic and informative discussion on national issues, culture, homes, health and lifestyle. In particular, the media is, meant to be a source of constructive dialogue on reforms of home and business, where tolerance and broad-mindedness should guide its writings and programming, along with objectivity and human respect."

Broadcasting 

Hringbraut is a free television that broadcasts Icelandic television programs (mainly Talk shows) along with commercials. It is dependent on selling advertising time or acquiring sponsors for its programs. It runs 24 hours a day in Iceland, in HD quality and SD quality.

References

External links 
 Web page of Hringbraut (In Icelandic)

Mass media companies of Iceland